The following table indicates the party of elected officials in the U.S. state of Oregon:
Governor
Oregon Secretary of State
Attorney General
State Treasurer
Commissioner of Labor and Industries
Superintendent of Public Instruction (before 2012)

The table also indicates the historical party composition in the:
State Senate
State House of Representatives
State delegation to the U.S. Senate
State delegation to the U.S. House of Representatives

For years in which a presidential election was held, the table indicates which party's nominees received the state's electoral votes.

Pre-statehood (1845–1858)

Statehood (1859–present)

References

See also
Politics in Oregon
Politics of Oregon
Elections in Oregon

Politics of Oregon
Oregon